Miguel del Águila (born September 15, 1957) is an Uruguayan-born, American composer of contemporary classical music.

Life 
American composer Miguel del Águila (also spelled Miguel del Aguila), was born in Montevideo. In 1978, del Águila moved to California, fleeing Uruguay's 1970's repressive military government. After graduating from the San Francisco Conservatory of Music, he travelled to Vienna, where he studied at the Hochschule für Musik and Konservatorium. Early premieres of his works in Vienna's Musikverein, Konzerthaus and Bösendorfer halls introduced his music and distinctive Latin sound to European audiences. In 1989, del Águila's work was performed in New York's Carnegie Recital Hall (now Weill Hall), and Lukas Foss conducted the U.S. premiere of Hexen, with the Brooklyn Philharmonic. CDs of his works were released on Albany Records and KKM-Austria by 1990, including his Clarinet Concerto, "Herbsttag", and "Hexen". Del Águila returned to the U.S. in 1992, where the Los Angeles Times described him as "one of the West Coast's most promising and enterprising young composers." He received the Kennedy Center Friedheim Award in 1995, and was music director of Ojai Camerata until 1999. He was resident composer at Chautauqua Institution Summer Festival from 2001 to 2005

Del Águila was among the first composers chosen by Meet the Composer and The American Symphony Orchestra League to receive a Music Alive Extended Residency grant. This resulted in the 2006 opera Time and Again Barelas, a partnership between the New Mexico Symphony and the National Hispanic Cultural Center in Albuquerque. Joanne Sheehy Hoover of the Albuquerque Journal wrote that the opera “displayed his command of an arresting musical vocabulary, marked by a complex yet infectious rhythmic vitality.”

In 2008, del Águila received a "Magnum Opus" commission administered by Meet the Composer, for performances by the Nashville Symphony, Buffalo Philharmonic, Virginia Symphony, and Winnipeg Symphony. The resulting tone poem, "The Fall of Cuzco", was premiered by the Nashville Symphony conducted by Giancarlo Guerrero in November 2009. In 2008–09, del Águila was given the Lancaster Symphony's Composer Award. His "Choral Suite No. 2" for mixed chorus and orchestra was performed by the symphony, and conducted by Stephen Gunzenhauser, in November 2008.

In 2010, del Águila received two Latin Grammy nominations, the first for the Bridge CD Salón Buenos Aires (for Best Classical Album), and another for his work "Clocks" (Best Classical Contemporary Composition), performed by Camerata San Antonio. "Clocks" also received a Copland Foundation Recording Award in 2009. In 2015, he received a third nomination for his "Concierto en Tango" (Best Classical Contemporary Composition), commissioned, premiered and recorded by the Buffalo Philharmonic with cello soloist Roman Mekinulov, and conducted by JoAnn Falletta.

Recordings of Miguel del Águila's over 130 works have been released on 56 CD albums to date, by Naxos, Dorian, Telarc, New Albion, Albany, Centaur and Eroica, among others. Peermusic Classical, and Theodore Presser have both published his works, alongside many which have been self-published. After many years in Southern California, del Águila now lives in Seattle.

Compositions

Chamber 
Chamber works without piano
 BOLIVIANA guitar and string quartet 20 HERBSTTAG (Autumn Day) fl, bn,harp 7:30 HEXEN bn,string ensemble 12 LIFE IS A DREAM string quartet 15 MALAMBO bassoon and string quartet 13 NOSTALGICA string qtet.,bassoon 19 PACIFIC SERENADE string quartet, clarinet (opt.sax) 16 PRESTO A CUATRO guitar quartet (opt.:4guit.4strgs) 6:00 PRESTO II string quartet 6 SUBMERGED – flute, viola, harp 10 THE DAY AFTER four cellos 3
 WIND QUINTET No.2 – fl,ob,cl,hn,bn 30 PROCESSION OF LUNATICS four cellos 9Chamber works with piano BROKEN RONDO English horn, pno. 13 CARIBBEAN BACCHANAL – 2 pianos/8 hands 13 CHARANGO CAPRICCIOSO string quartet,piano 14 CLARINET CONCERTO cl, pno 17 CLOCKS string quartet,pno. 17 CONGA-LINE IN HELL 1111-1111-hrp,1perc,pno. vl,va,vc,cb.11 CONGA-LINE IN HELL fl,cl,harp,piano,1perc,8 cellos. 11''
 CONGA-LINE IN HELL –  six pianos 13 HEXEN (Witches) bn,pno 12'''
 LATIN LOVE wind quintet,pno. 2005 MALAMBO bassoon and piano 13
 MIAMI FLUTE SUITE – flute and piano 23:00
 PACIFIC SERENADE clarinet and piano (opt.sax) 16
 RETURN vl,pno.15
 SALON BUENOS AIRES – fl,cl, vl,vla,vc,pno. 23:00
 SEDUCCION flute,cl,piano 9
 SEDUCCION DANCE fl,ob,pno or fl,bn,pno) 9
 SEDUCCION – vl,piano. 7'' SEXTET piano and wind quintet 8 SILENCE – violin and piano 10:00
 SILENCE – clarinet and piano 10:00
 SUMMER SONG – oboe,pno. 16
 SUNSET SONG – bassoon,pno 18
 TANGO TRIO –  vl,cello,pno. 12
 TANGO TRIO –  cl,cello,pno. (opt:ob,cello pno) 12
 TANGO TRIO –  ob,bn,pno. (opt:cl,bn,pno) 12

 Orchestral 
Orchestra
 BACK IN TIME – 3222,4331, 4 perc, 9:30
 CARIBBEAN BACCHANAL – 3333–4331,hrp, pno. perc. 13
 CARIBEÑA – orch. (2222-4221-pno-timp+2, strings) 8
 CARIBEÑA – ch. orch. (1111-1110-pno-timp+1, strings) 8
 CHAUTAUQUAN SUMMER  – full orch. 13
 SALON BUENOS AIRES – orchestra 20 CONGA – 2222,3221,pno, hrp, 12 CONGA-LINE IN HELL 1111-1111-hrp,1perc,pno. vl,va,vc,cb.11 THE FALL OF CUZCO – full orch. 20 THE GIANT GUITAR  –  full orch. 7 TIME AND AGAIN BARELAS OVERTURE – full orch. 9 TIME AND AGAIN BARELAS CHORAL SUITE – choir,orch 17 TIME AND AGAIN BARELAS SUITE 2 – orch/choir, solo tenor 33 TOCCATA – 2222–2111, large perc,pno,str. 8Solo Instrument / Voice and Orchestra BROKEN RONDO solo English horn and orch.  13 CLARINET CONCERTO solo Clarinet and orch. 25 CONCIERTO EN TANGO solo cello and orch. 18 CONCIERTO EN TANGO solo viola and orch. 18 CONCIERTO EN TANGO solo string quartet and orch. 18 IT IS SO COLD TONIGHT solo high voice and orchestra 9 ISLAMORADA solo piano and string orchestra 9:30
 HEXEN solo bassoon and string orch. 12 PIANO CONCERTO solo piano and orch. 25 RETURN TO HOMELAND solo violin and orch. 15 TIME AND AGAIN BARELAS CHORAL SUITE – choir,orch 17 TIME AND AGAIN BARELAS SUITE No.2 – orch. choir, solo tenor 33 ''VIOLIN CONCERTO solo violin and orch, 27

 Choral/Vocal 
 AGNUS DEI – med-high voice, pno. 7
 ALBUQUERQUE – barbershop quartet 3
 AVE MARIA – treble chorus and piano (opt Hrp) 5
 COMPOSER MISSING – chamber opera: choir, S,A,T,B soli 90
 CUAUHTEMOC – full length opera: orch,choir soli 3 hrs. CUAUHTEMOC CHORAL SUITE – choir,3 soli,pno,perc 35
 CUAUHTEMOC SONGS – T,B,S soli and piano 50
 FROM DARKNESS TO LIGHT – ch choir, wind quartet, harp. 8
 IT IS SO COLD TONIGHT  – tenor (opt. sopr. and orchestra) 7
 LACRYMOSA – med-high voice,piano 7:30
 OPHELIA IN SEVILLE – sopr, tenor, fl, cl, tbn, 2 vlns, vla, vc 16
 SALVA ME – choir a cappella (opt. piano) 7
 TIME AND AGAIN BARELAS – Opera in two acts: chorus, orchestra. alto, tenor and other soli. 150
 TIME AND AGAIN BARELAS CHORAL SUITE – orchestra, mixed chorus. 17
 TIME AND AGAIN BARELAS CHORAL SUITE No.2. Same plus overture, solo tenor. 29
 TROUBADOURS –  mixed choir, opt. pno., 10
Chamber arrangements
 L'ENFANT ET LES SORTILEGES  (Ravel) RISE AND FALL OF THE CITY OF MAHAGONNY  (Weill) Piano and solo Instrument 
 CONGA 10
 FOUR HAND ETUDE –  pno. 4-hands 4
 HALF OF ME –  pno. left hand only. 8
 MUSIC IN A BOTTLE –  10
 NOCTURNE 8 PIANO SONATA No.2 15 TOCCATA –  5'''
 VALS BRUTAL 5
Harpsichord/Organ
 BELLS WITH A MISSION – solo organ 15
 ONE OF YOU –  solo organ, 14 PICTURES FROM AMERICA – harpsichord 13'''
 TOCCATA – harpsichord 3:30
 OTHER
 TENNESSEE – guitar 11:30'''
 CUTTING LIMES – violin 4Dance, Film, TV' ACONGA-LINE IN HELL – Choreography by Annabella Gonzalez for Annabella Gonzalez Dance Theater (New York) CONVERGENCE (Silence/Seducción) – choreography by Brett Weidlich – Dance ART Ensemble/Ventura County Ballet – Focus on the Masters, Ventura, California DANSAQ – (PRESTO II) – Choreographed by Mari Fujibayashi and Olivia Rosenkrantz for Tapage Dance Ensemble (New York) TIME AND AGAIN BARELAS DANCES – Choreography by David Vega Chavez for New Mexico Ballet Dancers and New Mexico Symphony Orchestra. (Albuquerque, NM) CLOCKS – Choreography by Minou Lallemand for Onium Ballet Project and Chamber Music Hawaii.  (Honolulu, Hawaii) CAPADOCIA (Third Season)  – (SUNDIAL 2000 B.C. from CLOCKS) Co-production:  HBO Latin America and Argos Productions. Episode 36 "Taller con olor a muerto" Written by Laura Sosa, Leticia López Margalli, Guillermo Ríos Joaquín Guerrero Casasola and Carmen Madrid Directed by Javier Patrón, Carlos Carrera, Pitipol Ybarra. Starring Ana de la Reguera, Alejandro Camacho, Juan Manuel Berna, Dolores Heredia, Héctor Arredondo, Cecilia Suárez, Cristina Umaña, Marco Treviño... NATURALEZA QUIETA a documentary series produced by TV UNAM, Mexico Directed by Marcos Limenes and Carolina Kerlow Episodes: Sin aventuras no hay arte and El centro del equilibrio Recordings 
 CD Miguel del Aguila Orchestral Works Albany Augusta Symphony/Dirk Meyer/Guillermo Figueroa Works: Violin Concerto, The Fall of Cuzco, Tensando, The Giant Guitar, Salon Buenos Aires
 CD Barroqueada Extreme Tango Productions CD Eroica Trio Work: Barroqueada for piano trio (violin, cello and piano)
 CD Journeys- Norwegian Radio Orchestra Naxos Norwegian Radio Orchestra/Miguel Hearth-Bedoya work: The Gian Guitar
 CD All Worlds, All Times Bright Shiny Things CD Windsync Quintet Word: Wind Quinteto No.2
 CD Canto del Paraiso Clarinete MEstizo CD Javier Vinasco/Carlos Betancur works: Milonga – for clarinet and piano, Pacific Serenade – for clarinet and piano
 CD Luces Ausentes CD Benjamin Harris Plays Miguel del Aguila  works: Malambo - for flute bass and piano, Silence - for bass and piano, Tensando - for violin bass and piano, Presto a Dos – for cello and bass, Luces Ausentes - for flute, violin and bass, Cutting Limes - for solo violin, Invisibles - for solo piano
 CD Tierras Juntas Aria Classics Cuarteto Latinoamericano/Entrequatre work: Presto a 8
 CD Salón Buenos Aires Bridge Records CD 9302 Camerata San Antonio 2010 Grammy nominated for best Classical Album, and best Contemporary Classical Composition Works: Charango Capriccioso – for piano and string quartet Presto II – for string quartet Salon Buenos Aires – for chamber ensemble Life is a Dream – for string quartet Clocks – for piano and string quartet
 CD Built for Buffalo Beau Fleuve / BPO Label Buffalo Philharmonic Orchestra Roman Mekinulov, cello JoAnn Falletta, conductor 2015 Grammy nominated for Best Contemporary Classical Composition Work: Concierto en Tango for solo cello and orchestra
 CD Havana Moon Steinway & Sons Catalogue #: STNS30052 TransAtlantic Ensemble Mariam Adam, clarinet Evelyn Ulex, piano Works: Silence – for clarinet and piano Tango Trio – for violin, clarinet and piano Nocturne – for solo piano
 CD Orion Nocturne Albany Records ASIN: B07FCQRFZ8 Carlos Miguel Prieto, Conductor Louisiana Philharmonic Orchestra Johanna Cox Pennington, English Horn Work: Broken Rondo (Rondó Roto) Concerto for English horn and orchestra
 Del Caribe Soy Naxos (CD 8579016) Nestor Torres, flute Miguel del Aguila, piano Work: Miami Flute Suite – for flute and piano
 CD Garden of Joys and Sorrows Bridge Records (CD 9472) Hat Trick Ensemble Work: Submerged – for flute, viola and harp
 CD Th. Berger - Miguel del Aguila Albany Records CD: TROY066 American Music Ensemble Vienna Wenzel Fuchs, clarinet Hobart Earle, conductor Judith Farmer, bassoon Works: Clarinet Concerto – for clarinet and orchestra Herbsttag –  for flute, bassoon and harp Hexen – for bassoon and string orchestra
 CD Summer Song Profil  DDD – CD: 8977712 Katsuya Watanabe / David Johnson Works: Summer Song – for oboe and piano
 CD Clocks Hoot/Wisdom Recordings, FAU Piano Quintets of the Americas Cuarteto Latinoamericano / H. Coltman Works: Charango Capriccioso Clocks – for piano and string quartet 2010 Grammy nominated for best Contemporary Classical Composition
 CD Serenata Latina Elias Duo CD: 700261477145 Released 2019 Elias Duo Carlos Elias, violin Andrea Arese-Elias, piano Works: Silence – for violin and piano
 CD Silence Miguel del Aguila/CDBaby CD: 195079615979 Javier Vinasco, clarinet Miguel del Aguila, piano Works: Silence – for clarinet and piano Pacific Serenade – for clarinet and piano Islamorada – for piano Milonga – for clarinet and piano Seducción – for clarinet and piano Estudio Rítmico – for clarinet solo Malambo – for clarinet and piano
 CD Miguel del Aguila Piano Works Miguel del Aguila/CDBaby: Miguel del Aguila, piano Works: Conga – for piano Nocturne – for piano Toccata – for piano Music in a Bottle – for piano Piano Sonata No.2 – for piano Islamorada – for piano Vals Brutal – for piano
 CD Carte Postale Naxos/Atma Classique ACD2 2502 Quatour Alcan Works: Presto II – for string quartet
 CD De Europa a las Américas EAFIT University Recording, Colombia Trio Acuarimántima Work: Disagree! – for clarinet viola and piano
 CD Latinoamericana Modica Music The Annex Quartet Work: Presto II – for string quartet
 CD Piano Dance Telarc CD: 80549 Gloria Cheng, piano Works: Conga – for solo piano
 CD Discoveries 20th Century Music for Wind Quintet Helicon Records HE1030 Borealis Wind Quintet Works: Wind Quintet No.2
 CD Refuge Albany Records (Troy CD 1484) The Divan Consort Work: Seducción – for flute clarinet and piano
 CD Conga-Line in Hell Dorian CD: DOR93230 Camerata de las Americas Joel Sachs cond. /  Duane Cochran piano Works: Conga-Line in Hell –  for chamber ensemble
 CD Crossing America Eroica Classical Recordings CD JDT 3469 TransAtlantic Ensemble Mariam Adams, clarinet / Evelyn Ulex, piano Works: Pacific Serenade – for Clarinet and Piano
 CD Eco de Violin IUMusic-LAMC Recording Colin Sorgi, violin / Jooeun Pak, piano Works: Seducción – for violin and piano
 CD 4+1 Contemporary Music for String Quartet Universidad EAFIT Recordings Javier Asdrúbal Vinasco, clarinet Cuarteto Q-Arte Works: Pacific Serenade – for clarinet and string quartet
 CD Nostalgica Centaur Records CD: CRC2564 Barrick Stees bassoon / Randall Fusco, piano The Arianna String Quartet Works: Nostalgica – for bassoon and string quartet Sunset Song  – for bassoon and piano
 CD Latin Perspective Cubafilin Records Ltd. / state 51 (UK Santiago String Quartet Works: Presto II – for string quartet
 CD Border Crossings Pacific Serenades Recordings CD: 06132-3 Gary Gray, clarinet / Pacific Serenade Ensemble Works: Pacific Serenade – for clarinet and string quartet
 CD Conga-Line in Hell Redwood Recordings Redwood Symphony Orchestra Eric Kujawsky, cond. Works: Conga –  for orchestra
 CD Seducción Albany Records (Troy CD 1727) Stephanie Jutt, flute Orlando Pimentel, Clarinet Elena Abend, piano Works: Seducción – for flute, clarinet and piano
 CD Latin American Piano Trios Bridge Records CD 9302 Centaur Records CRC3336 Arcos Trio Work: Tango Trio – for violin, cello and piano
 CD Arpassión Suisa/TrioCorda Recording TrioCorda Harp Trio Zurich Works Sumergida – for three harps
 CD Oboe on the Road Centaur Records CRC2451 Mark Weiger oboe / Robert Conway piano (older first version) Works: Summersong – for oboe and piano
 CD Esprits Nomades White Records CD: USHM81880319 – ASIN B07H3F5XJ9 Released 2018 Trio Manestri Work: Seducción – for violin, flute and piano
 CD 20th Century Dances Scotwood Music – USA James Miltenberger, piano Works: Music in a Bottle – for solo piano Conga – for solo piano
 CD Exchange Latin America New World Records CRI CD: 848 Gary Gray, clarinet Pacific Serenade Ensemble Works: Pacific Serenade – for clarinet and string quartet
 CD Permanent Transitions Metro Records CD: MCD59601 Matthew Greif, guitar Works: Tennessee – for solo guitar
 CD Piano Music of the Americas ACA Digital Recordings CD: CM20021-21 James Miltenberger, piano Works: Piano Sonata No.2 – for solo piano
 CD Four for Tango New Albion NA100CD Cuarteto Latinoamericano Works: Presto II – for string quartet
 CD El Tiempo Global Entertainment  Mexico GECDI4111 Onix Ensemble Alejandro Escuer conductor and Flute Mauricio Nader, piano Works: Clocks – for piano and string quartet 2010 Grammy nominated for best Contemporary Classical Composition
 CD From the Americas Rebeat Digital, Austria – Tango Malambo TransAtlantic Ensemble Mariam Adam, Clarinet / Evelyn Ulex, piano Works: Pacific Serenade – for clarinet and piano
 CD East Meets West Sony Austria/ORF LID19924 Odessa Philharmonic Orchestra Hobart Earle, cond. Works: Toccata – for orchestra
 CD Life is a Dream Madison String Quartet Recording Madison String Quartet Works: Life is a Dream – for string quartet Presto II – for string quartet
 CD KaleidosCoping Equilibrium Recordings CD IQ148 Michael Gordon, flute Celeste Johnson, oboe Sean Chen, piano Works: Seduction Dance – for flute, oboe and piano
 CD My Song in the Night Faye Dumont Singers Release Melbourne Women's Choir Works: Ave Maria – for chorus and piano
 CD Mi Chelada Urtext Digital Classics – Mexico Alvaro Bitran, cello Works: The Day After – for eight (or four) cellos
 CD Cello Innovations Centaur Records CD: 3623 Ashley Sandor Sidon /Erik Anderson Jesús Morales, cellos Works: Procesión de Locos  – for four cellos
 CD Batata-Coco Conaculta – Mexico Camerata de las Americas Joel Sachs, conductor / Duane Cochran piano Works: Conga-Line in Hell – for chamber ensemble
 CD Arrivals and Departures Mark Records CD ASIN: B07G1WXT63 Lyrique Quintette Works Wind Quintet No.3
 CD Soaring Solo MSR Classics Stephanie Sant’Ambrogio, violin Works: Cutting Limes – for solo violin
 CD Marinka Brecelj Harpsichord KKM  Vienna – Austria CD 3032-2 Marinka Brecelj, harpsichord Works: Toccata – for solo harpsichord Cuadros de America – for solo harpsichord
 CD Laberintos Australian National University ANCLAS Recording Duo Deconet Henry Avila, violin / Irma Enriquez, piano Works: Seducción – for violin and piano

 References 

 External links 
Official Web Site
Dirk Meyer, Chamber Orchestra and Ensemble Repertoire
Yew Chong Cheung. 2009. "An Introduction to the Solo Piano Works of Three Latin American Composers". D.M.A. thesis. Morgantown: West Virginia University.
 Mukhamedzyanova, Dina. "Miguel del Aguila: 'Write the music that comes from your heart without caring about what's fashionable or what the rest of the world thinks you should be writing'". Musika Rossii'' (The Music of Russia).
Frank Oteri, Sounds Heard, New Music Box – New Music USA
Peermusic Classical: Miguel del Aguila Composer's Publisher and Bio
Clariperu Magazine – Miguel del Aguila
International Double Reed Society Magazine – Miguel del Aguila – Broken Rondo
International Double Reed Society Magazine – Miguel del Aguila – Broken Rondo (Archive)

21st-century classical composers
1957 births
Uruguayan classical composers
20th-century classical composers
San Francisco Conservatory of Music alumni
Living people
Musicians from Montevideo
21st-century American composers
Male classical composers
20th-century American composers
20th-century American male musicians
21st-century American male musicians
List of Hispanic and Latino Americans
Latin Grammy Award for Best Classical Album
Music of the United States
List of 21st-century classical composers